Bernacchi is a surname, and may refer to:

 Antonio Maria Bernacchi, Italian castrato singer (1685-1756)
 , Italian actress and dubber (1910-2006)
 Louis Bernacchi, physicist, astronomer and explorer (1876-1942)
 , Italian journalist and presenter
 Quirico Bernacchi, Italian cyclist (1914-2006)

Surnames of Italian origin